Scrobipalpa argenteonigra is a moth in the family Gelechiidae. It was described by Povolný in 1972. It is found in northern Iran.

The forewings are deep black with three milky to silvery white fasciae. The hindwings are dirty whitish, with blackish tips.

Subspecies
Scrobipalpa argenteonigra argenteonigra
Scrobipalpa argenteonigra halocnemi (Falkovitsh & Bidzilya, 2006) (Uzbekistan, south-eastern Kazakhstan)

References

Scrobipalpa
Moths described in 1972